Duckington is a small village and civil parish in the unitary authority of Cheshire West and Chester and the ceremonial county of Cheshire, England. It is situated some 10½ miles (17 km) south-east of Chester, 10 miles (16 km) east of Wrexham and 4⅓ miles (7 km) east of the Welsh border.

See also

Listed buildings in Duckington

External links

Civil parishes in Cheshire
Villages in Cheshire